New Way Academy is a secular day school in Phoenix, Arizona for children with learning differences grades K-12. It is a member of the Canyon Athletic Association.

External links
New Way Academy, official website

Schools in Phoenix, Arizona